Eduardo Lefebvre Scovell (1864–1918) was a British artist. He is one of the Volcano School, a group of non-native artists who painted dramatic nocturnal scenes of Hawaii's erupting volcanoes.

Following his education at Eton College and the University of Cambridge,  Scovell studied art in Paris.  He then traveled extensively, including one year in Rome and Florence.  Several years were spent in India, China and Japan.  He visited Brazil and spent eight years in Hawaii where he specialized in volcano scenes.  He was in San Francisco during the earthquake and fire of 1906 and then settled in Los Angeles.  Scovell was a resident there until his death on 23 September 1918.

Scovell's painting Kilauea is in the Bernice P. Bishop Museum in Honolulu.

References
 Hughes, Edan, Artists in California 1786-1940, Sacramento, Crocker Art Museum, 2002.
 Severson, Don R., Finding Paradise, Island Art in Private Collections, University of Hawaii Press, 2002, 98.

External links
 Eduardo Lefebvre Scovell in AskArt.com
 Smithsonian American Art Museum, Art Inventories Catalog

Footnotes

19th-century British painters
British male painters
20th-century British painters
People educated at Eton College
1864 births
Volcano School painters
Landscape artists
1918 deaths
19th-century British male artists
20th-century British male artists